Composites Technology Research Malaysia Sdn Bhd (CTRM) is a Malaysian high technology based industrial company that involved in the aerospace and composites industries. The company's main products includes UAV, composites aerostructure, satcom antenna and radome. The company consists of CTRM Aero Composites, CTRM Composites Engineering, Composites Testing Laboratory, CTRM Aviation, CTRM Systems Integration and Unmanned Systems Technology. 

The company is now fully owned by DEFTECH.

History

The company located in Shah Alam, Selangor and it was incorporated on 20 November 1990 by ministry of finance with the goal to be the one of the recognised aerospace and composite hub in the region. One of the early achievement of the company is locally manufactured the Eagle Aircraft Eagle 150. The company is also recognised as a pioneer in the development and manufacturing of the local Unmanned Aerial Vehicle (UAV) with its Aludra UAV. Other than that, CTRM also produced composites component for the aircraft. 

CTRM is part of the global supply chain in composites aero structures for major commercial and military aircraft manufacturers in the world. This included the aircraft composites parts for the Airbus A320, Airbus A350, Airbus A380 and Airbus A400. The company also responsible for the construction of the radome for the Malaysian authorities including Royal Malaysian Air Force.

DEFTECH's acquisition 

In 2014, DEFTECH acquired CTRM and all its subsidiaries under a multi million worth contract. This will made all the CTRM's products will using the DEFTECH badge. Under this acquisition, there will be three division which is :

DEFTECH Systems Integration  

Formerly known as CTRM Systems Integration. Incorporated in 2010 to develop Malaysian integration capabilities. The main course of this division is to designing, developing and integrating the systems and provided engineering and repairing of electronic devices.

DEFTECH Unmanned Systems 

Formerly known as Unmanned Systems Technology under CTRM. Incorporated in 2007 and offers a wide range of UAV products and services.

DEFTECH Aviation 
Formerly known as CTRM. Focus on aerospace and composites technology for aircraft.

Products
 Aludra UAV
 Eagle 150 aircraft
 Composites parts for the Airbus A320, Airbus A350, Airbus A380 and Airbus A400
Radome

References

1990 establishments in Malaysia
Privately held companies of Malaysia
Defense companies of Malaysia
Aerospace companies of Malaysia
Malaysian brands
Aircraft engineering companies